Albin Andersson  (22 December 1873 – 30 July 1949) was a Swedish farmer, bank manager, and politician. He was a member of the Farmer's League (Centre Party), and represented Gothenburg and Bohus County in the upper house of the Swedish bicameral parliament in 1922–1925.

References

Members of the Riksdag from the Centre Party (Sweden)
1873 births
1949 deaths
Members of the Första kammaren